Guangji Nanlu Station is a station on Line 1 and Line 2 of Suzhou Rail Transit. The station is located in Gusu District, Suzhou. It began operation on April 28, 2012 with the opening of Line 1. The Line 2 platforms began operation on December 28, 2013 with the opening of Line 2.

A free interchange is available between the two lines. The station is the first and so far only transfer station of the Suzhou Rail Transit system.

Station layout

Timetable

Exits
 1: Southwest corner of Guangji Lu and Ganjiang Lu
 2: Southeast corner of Guangji Lu and Ganjiang Lu
 3: Northeast corner of Guangji Lu and Ganjiang Lu
 4: Northwest corner of Guangji Lu and Ganjiang Lu, on the side of Ganjiang Lu
 9: Northwest corner of Guangji Lu and Ganjiang Lu, on the side of Guangji Lu

Local attractions
 Suzhou Rail Transit Headquarters
 Lingtang Xincun
 Dianzi Xincun
 Hongling Garden
 Lijinghuating Garden
 Xichengyongjie Living Plaza
 Suzhou Post Building (Suzhou Post Bureau)
 Youtong Shumagang
 Suzhou Local Taxation Bureau

Bus connections
 Guangji Nanlu bus stop – bus routes 70, 88, 332, 333, 333 Longchi Special Line, 921 and 932
 Fenghuolu Bei bus stop – bus Routes 2, 9, 60, 88, 262, 303, 332, 333, 333 Longchi Special Line and 900
 Changxu Lu bus stop – bus routes 2, 9, 60, 70, 262, 303, 900, 921 and 932

References

Railway stations in Jiangsu
Suzhou Rail Transit stations
Railway stations in China opened in 2012